Ajmer railway division is one of the four railway divisions under North Western Railway zone of Indian Railways. This railway division was formed on 5 November 1951 and its headquarter is located at Ajmer in the state of Rajasthan of India.

Jaipur railway division, Bikaner railway division and Jodhpur railway division are the other three railway divisions under NWR Zone headquartered at Jaipur. This division is one of the key enabler of the Delhi Mumbai Industrial Corridor Project by virtue of running parts of the railways 1,500 km long network of Western Dedicated Freight Corridor.

History

Rail transport infrastructure 
The zone has the following types of locomotive engines:
(Legends: W - broad gauge, D - diesel, G - goods, M - mixed, P - passenger)

 Abu Road railway station (ABR) diesel sheds: WDM2s, WDM3s, WDG3A and WDG4s

Medical facilities 
For the employees and their families, the division also has the following healthcare facilities:
 Zonal hospitals 
 Jaipur Zonal Railway Hospital near Jaipur Junction railway station 
 Divisional hospitals 
 Ajmer Divisional Railway Hospital near Ajmer Junction railway station
 Sub-divisional hospitals 
 Abu Road Sub-Divisional Railway Hospital near Abu Road railway station (Ajmer division)
 Health units, several (total 29 across the whole division, including 3 other zones)
 First aid posts, unknown (no more than a total of two across the whole zone)

Training 
The zone has the following training institutes:
 Zonal Railway Training Institute, Udaipur in Ajmer division
 Diesel Traction Training Centre, Abu Road in Ajmer division
 Divisional Training Centre (Engineering), Ajmer
 Supervisor's Training Centre, Ajmer
 Basic Training Centre (C&W), Ajmer
 Basic Training Centre (Loco), Ajmer
 Area Training Centre, Ajmer

Route and track length 
 North Western Railway zone
 Route km: broad gauge , metre gauge , total  
 Track km: broad gauge , metre gauge , total 
 Ajmer railway division
 Route km: broad gauge , metre gauge , total 
 Track km: broad gauge , metre gauge , total

List of railway stations and towns 
The list includes the stations under the AJMER railway division and their station category.

Stations closed for Passengers -

References

See also 

 
Divisions of Indian Railways
1951 establishments in Rajasthan